Mora is a town and municipality in Toledo province, in the autonomous community of Castile-La Mancha, Spain.  The area is most famous for the abandoned ruins of the San Marcos de Yegros monastery of the Order of Santiago, located northeast of the town of Mora about 10 km on the Calle de los Dolores in the village of Paraje de Yegros.

Name
The term "Mora" possibly derives from the Latin morum meaning moral. However, Galmés de Fuentes has proposed an earlier origin, indicating that the pre-Roman root mor means "heap of stones" or cairn.

Geography
This town is situated in the Montes de Toledo. It belongs to the region of La Mancha, and borders the municipalities of Villamuelas and Huerta de Valdecarabanos at north, Villanueva de Bogas and Tembleque at east, Turleque, Los Yebenes and Consuegra at south, Orgaz and Manzaneque at west and Mascaraque at northwest.

Administration

Demography
Demographic Trends

References

External links
 "Mora (Provincia de Toledo - Castilla-La Mancha)" map and photographs from Panageos

Municipalities in the Province of Toledo